Hasta (meaning: Hand or fist) is a nakshatra (lunar mansion) in Hindu astrology having a spread from 10° – 23° 20′. It corresponds to the stars of Alpha, Beta, Delta, Gamma, and Epsilon-Corvi in the constellation Corvus (constellation).

See also
 Archaeoastronomy and Vedic chronology
 History of astrology
 Indian astronomy
 Nadi astrology
 Synoptical astrology

References

Nakshatra